Singrist is a former commune in the Bas-Rhin department in north-eastern France. On 1 January 2016, it was merged into the new commune Sommerau.

See also
 Communes of the Bas-Rhin department

References

Former communes of Bas-Rhin
Populated places disestablished in 2016